Henry Lin may refer to:

Henry Lin (astronomer) (born 1995), American astronomer
Henry Lin (businessman) (fl. 2000s–2010s), Chinese businessman
Henry Lin (character), Sons of Anarchy character

See also
Henry Lien (fl. 2010s–2020s), author of juvenile speculative fiction
Henry Line (fl. 1880s–1930s), Archdeacon of Waterford
Henry Lynn (1895–1984), Polish-American film director, screenwriter, and producer